England, My England is a 1995 British historical film directed by Tony Palmer and starring Michael Ball, Simon Callow, Lucy Speed and Robert Stephens. It depicts the life of the composer Henry Purcell, seen through the eyes of a playwright in the 1960s who is trying to write a play about him. It was written by John Osborne and Charles Wood.

Cast
 Simon Callow ... Charles II
 Michael Ball ... Henry Purcell
 Rebecca Front ... Mary II
 Lucy Speed ... Nell Gwyn
 Letitia Dean ... Lady Castlemaine
 Nina Young ... Frances Purcell
 John Shrapnel ... Samuel Pepys
 Robert Stephens ... John Dryden
 Terence Rigby ... Captain Henry Cooke
 Bill Kenwright ... Bill
 Murray Melvin ...  Earl of Shaftesbury
 Corin Redgrave ... William of Orange
 John Fortune ... Edward Hyde, Earl of Clarendon
 Guy Henry ... James II
 Peter Woodthorpe ... Kiffen
 Edward Michie ... Young Harry
 Tom Shrapnel ... Young Pelham
 Antonia de Sancha ... Louise
 Constantine Gregory ... Colonel Wharton
 Rebecca Tremain ... Catherine of Bragança
 Vernon Dobtcheff ... Dr. Spratt
 Tim Newton ... Harry Purcell Snr
 Patricia Quinn ... Elizabeth Purcell
 David Thomas ... John Gostling
 James Saxon ... Vyner
 Michael John Wade ...Baron of Clifford and Chudleigh
 Brook Williams ... Priest
 Leslie Ashton ... Bishop
 David Spinx ... Smith

References

External links

1995 films
British historical drama films
British biographical drama films
1990s biographical drama films
1990s historical drama films
Films directed by Tony Palmer
Films set in the 17th century
Films set in the 1960s
Films set in England
Films about classical music and musicians
Films about composers
1995 drama films
Cultural depictions of Charles II of England
Cultural depictions of Barbara Palmer, 1st Duchess of Cleveland
Cultural depictions of Nell Gwyn
Cultural depictions of Catherine of Braganza
1990s English-language films
1990s British films
Cultural depictions of James II of England